Rand Peak is a prominent peak (1510 m) in the south part of Nebraska Peaks, Britannia Range. Named by Advisory Committee on Antarctic Names (US-ACAN) after John H. Rand, U.S. Army Cold Regions Research and Engineering Laboratory (CRREL), who drilled ice core at site J-11 (82?22'S, 168?40'W) during the Ross Ice Shelf Project, austral summers 1974-75 and 1976–77.

Mountains of Oates Land